Letizia Tontodonati (born 27 September 1999) is an Italian rower bronze world winner at junior level at the World Rowing Junior Championships.

Achievements

References

External links
 

1999 births
Living people
Italian female rowers
Sportspeople from Turin